RobiHachi is a 12-episode Japanese anime television series produced by Studio Comet. The series aired from April 8 to June 24, 2019.  The storyline is futurist but alludes to the story of Tōkaidōchū Hizakurige.  The comically silly and purposely lame Hizakuriger robot (named after the Tōkaidō story) makes its appearance, a reimagining of the long forgotten 1970s era robot anime Chōgattai Majutsu Robo Ginguiser.

Characters

Hatchi is a debt collector.

Production
An original anime was announced by Studio Comet on November 19, 2018. The 12-episode series is directed by Shinji Takamatsu, with Hiroko Kanasugi handling series composition and Yuuko Yahiro designing the characters. It aired from April 8 to June 24, 2019, on AbemaTV and AT-X.

References

External links
  
 

2019 anime television series debuts
Anime with original screenplays
AT-X (TV network) original programming
Funimation